Cobalt(III) chloride or cobaltic chloride is an unstable and elusive compound of cobalt and chlorine with formula . In this compound, the cobalt atoms have a formal charge of +3.  

The compound has been reported to exist in the gas phase at high temperatures, in equilibrium with cobalt(II) chloride and chlorine gas.  It has also been found to be stable at very low temperatures, dispersed in a frozen argon matrix.  

Some articles from the 1920s and 1930s claim the synthesis of bulk amounts of this compound in pure form; however, those results do not seem to have been reproduced, or have been attributed to other substances like the hexachlorocobaltate(III) anion .  Those earlier reports claim that it gives green solutions in anhydrous solvents such as ethanol and diethyl ether, and that it is stable only a very low temperatures (below −60 °C).

Structure and properties
The infrared spectrum of the compound in frozen argon indicates that the isolated  molecule is planar with D3h symmetry.

A Scientific study of the stability of this and other metal trihalides at 50 °C was published by Nelsoon and Sharpe in 1956.

Aerodynamic properties for the gas phase have been determined by the Glushko Thermocenter of the Russian  Academy  of  Sciences.

Preparation
Cobalts trichlorides was detected in 1952 by Schäfer and Krehl in the gas phase when cobalt(II) chloride  is heated in an atmosphere of chlorine .  The trichloride is formed through the equilibrium 
 2 +  ↔ 2 
However, equilibrium shifts to the left at higher temperatures. At 1073 K, the partial pressures were 7.3 and 31.3 mm Hg, respectively. 

Cobalt trichloride, in amounts sufficient to study spectroscopically, was obtained by Green and others in 1983, by sputtering cobalt electrodes with chlorine atoms and trapping the resulting molecules in frozen argon at 14 K.

In a 1932 report, the compound was claimed to arise in the electrolysis of cobalt(II) chloride in anhydrous ethanol.

Related compounds
The hexachlorocobaltate(III) anion  has been identified in preparations of cobalt(III) salts and hydrochloric acid  in glacial acetic acid.  

Trichlorides of cobalt(III) complexed with various ligands, such as organic amines, can be quite stable.  In particular, hexamminecobalt(III) chloride  is the archetypal Werner complex and has uses in biological research.  Another classical example is tris(ethylenediamine)cobalt(III) chloride .

References

Cobalt(III) compounds
Inorganic compounds
Chlorides
Metal halides